Šárka is an old female given name of Bohemian origin. In the Czech Republic, it is the seventy-second most common female name. Šárka is also the name of a cliff on the north-western outskirts of Prague. The mythological heroine, Šárka, is said to have jumped from this cliff out of remorse for helping to lure Ctirad, a local hero, into a trap. 

People bearing the name include:
Šárka Barborková, Czech volleyball player
Šárka Cojocarová, Czech model
Šárka Grossová, Czech entrepreneur
Šárka Kašpárková, Czech athlete
Šárka Křížková, Czech badminton player
Šárka Kubínová, Czech volleyball player
Šárka Melichárková, Czech volleyball player
Šárka Nováková, Czech high jumper
Šárka Pančochová, Czech snowboarder
Šárka Strachová, Czech alpine skier
Šárka Sudová, Czech skier
Šárka Svobodná, Czech orienteering competitor
Šárka Ullrichová, Czech actress
Šárka Vaňková, Czech singer
Šárka Vondrková, Czech ice dancer

Mythical characters
Šárka, a mythical warrior-maiden of Bohemia, a character in The Maidens' War

References

Czech feminine given names